Stylianos Stratakos (born 14 September 1914, date of death unknown) was a Greek sprinter. He competed in the men's 400 metres at the 1948 Summer Olympics.

References

External links

1914 births
Year of death missing
Athletes (track and field) at the 1948 Summer Olympics
Greek male sprinters
Greek male middle-distance runners
Olympic athletes of Greece
Athletes from Athens
20th-century Greek people